The Little Lost River is a river in the central part of the U.S. state of Idaho. Instead of emptying into a larger body of water, it disappears into the ground at the edge of the Snake River Plain, a phenomenon that gives it its name. The water feeds into the Snake River Aquifer, eventually reaching the Snake River through a series of springs farther west.

Course
The river flows generally south-southeast receiving many tributaries such as Wet (the largest), Badger, Deer, Uncle Ike, Sands, Cedarville, South, and Hurst creeks. Along its course the Little Lost is used for irrigation, but the only settlement of any size is Howe, situated near the mouth.

Precipitation is generally very low and mostly in the form of snow.

Highway
Along the way, the highway crosses the Little Lost River twice.  north of Clyde, the highway becomes Pahsimeroi Road.

See also
Big Lost River
List of rivers of Idaho

References

Rivers of Idaho
Rivers of Butte County, Idaho